Trinity Episcopal Church is a historic Episcopal church located at Potsdam in St. Lawrence County, New York. It was built in 1835 in the Federal style with Gothic elements built of red Potsdam Sandstone. It was greatly enlarged and transformed into High Victorian Gothic style later in the 19th century, with less significant alterations continuing into the 20th century. The front facade of the church took its final form in 1886 and is a lavishly decorated Victorian Gothic creation, made possible by donations from Thomas S. Clarkson and his family. Also on the property is a stone wall dating to 1870, a large cast iron urn dating to about 1880 and a cast iron lamppost on a sandstone base dating to 1880.

It was listed on the National Register of Historic Places in 2003.

References

Churches on the National Register of Historic Places in New York (state)
Episcopal church buildings in New York (state)
Federal architecture in New York (state)
Gothic Revival church buildings in New York (state)
Churches completed in 1835
19th-century Episcopal church buildings
Churches in St. Lawrence County, New York
Sandstone churches in the United States
National Register of Historic Places in St. Lawrence County, New York
1835 establishments in New York (state)